Personal communications network (PCN) is the European digital cellular mobile telephone network, developed in accordance with GSM standards.

The PCN system was first initiated by Lord Young, UK Secretary of State for Trade and Industry, in 1988. The main characteristics of PCN are as follows:
 Operating frequency – 1.7–1.88 GHz (1710–1785 MHz and 1805–1880 MHz).
 Uses 30 GHz or up for microwave back bone system.
 Covers both small cells and large cells.
 Coverage inside and outside buildings.
 Hand over.
 Cell delivery.
 Portable hand set.
 User intelligent network.

PCN uses the DCS-1800 systems, which is similar to GSM, but up converts the frequency to 1.7–1.88 GHz, therefore the network structure, the signal structure and the transmission characteristics are similar between PCN and GSM, but operational frequencies are different.

The UK government's Department for Enterprise produced 'Phones on the Move: Personal Communications in the 1990s - a discussion document' in January 1989. The document presented a vision for how mobile communications might develop which outlined ideas for both the PCNs and the CT2 standards.

External links
 Press Notice: LORD YOUNG CALLS FOR APPLICATIONS TO RUN "PHONES ON THE MOVE"

Telephony
Wireless networking